Weekend in L.A. is a 1978 live album by jazz/soul guitarist George Benson. The album was recorded live at the Roxy Theatre in West Hollywood, California. It was certified Platinum by the RIAA.

Track listing

"Weekend in L.A." (George Benson) – 7:28
"On Broadway" (Jerry Leiber, Barry Mann, Mike Stoller, Cynthia Weil) – 10:07
"Down Here on the Ground" (Gale Garnett, Lalo Schifrin) – 4:54
"California P.M." (Benson) – 7:04
"The Greatest Love of All" (Linda Creed, Michael Masser) – 5:43
"It's All in the Game" (Charles G. Dawes, Carl Sigman) – 3:54
"Windsong" (Neil Larsen) – 6:13
"Ode to a Kudu" (Benson) – 7:25
"Lady Blue" (Leon Russell) – 3:39
"We All Remember Wes" (Stevie Wonder) – 5:47
"We as Love" (Ronnie Foster) – 7:05

Personnel
 George Benson – lead guitar, vocals
 Phil Upchurch – rhythm guitar
 Jorge Dalto – acoustic piano, keyboards 
 Ronnie Foster – synthesizers
 Stanley Banks – bass
 Harvey Mason – drums
 Ralph MacDonald – percussion
 Nick DeCaro – additional string ensemble arrangements

Production
 Tommy LiPuma – producer 
 Noel Newbolt – production assistant 
 Al Schmitt – recording, mixing
 Don Henderson – assistant engineer 
 Doug Sax – mastering at The Mastering Lab (Hollywood, California).
 John Calbalka – art direction 
 Brad Kanawyer – design 
 Charles DiBona – lettering 
 Tom Bert – cover and inner spread photography 
 Jim McCrary – back cover photography 
 Fred Valentine – musicians insert photography

Charts

Weekly charts

Year-end charts

Certifications

See also
List of number-one R&B albums of 1978 (U.S.)

References

George Benson albums
1978 live albums
Warner Records live albums
Albums produced by Tommy LiPuma
Albums recorded at the Roxy Theatre